Steven A. Ediger (born June 24, 1956) is a lawyer from Hutchinson, Kansas who served one term as a Democratic member of the Kansas House of Representatives. He was defeated in 1984 by Republican Michael O'Neal, also a lawyer from Hutchinson.

References 

1956 births
Kansas lawyers
Living people
Politicians from Hutchinson, Kansas
Democratic Party members of the Kansas House of Representatives
20th-century American politicians